Cupriavidus campinensis is a gram-negative soil bacterium of the genus Cupriavidus and the family  Burkholderiaceae which was isolated in northeast Belgium.
C. campinensis species were found to be highly resistant to heavy metals and antibiotics due to their genomic potentials

References

External links
Type strain of Cupriavidus campinensis at BacDive -  the Bacterial Diversity Metadatabase

Burkholderiaceae
Bacteria described in 2004